Pietro Pavan (30 August 1903 - 26 December 1994) was an Italian Cardinal of the Roman Catholic Church from 1985 until his death in 1994. He was appointed by John Paul II on 25 May 1985. He helped draft the papal encyclical Pacem in terris.

References

1903 births
1994 deaths
Cardinals created by Pope John Paul II
20th-century Italian cardinals
People from Treviso
Pontifical Gregorian University alumni
University of Padua alumni